Robert Dickie may refer to:
 Robert Dickie (boxer)
 Robert Dickie (footballer)

See also
Robert Dickey (disambiguation)